I Can Do That is an Indian reality television series based on the American show of the same name. It was launched on 17 October 2015 and is broadcast on Zee TV. The series is produced by Essel Vision Productions. The series is the Indian adaptation of the American television series where participants would be challenged to showcase their skills on various tasks. The show is hosted by actor Farhan Akhtar.

Contestants 
 Madhurima Tuli
 Gauahar Khan
 Ranveer Brar
 VJ Bani
 Meiyang Chang
 VJ Andy
 Dino Morea
 Rithvik Dhanjani
 Shibani Dandekar
 Bharti Singh
 Gurmeet Choudhary
 Mandira Bedi

Results 
Rithvik Dhanjani was the winner.

Gauahar Khan was 1st runner- up. 

Madhurima Tuli was the 2nd runner-up.

References

See also
 Nach Baliye
 Dance India Dance

2015 Indian television series debuts
Indian reality television series
Hindi-language television shows
Television shows set in Mumbai
Zee TV original programming
Indian television series based on American television series